The Sabotage Assault Reconnaissance Group (DShRG) "Rusich" is a Russian far-right or Neo-Nazi paramilitary unit that has been fighting against Ukrainian forces in the Russo-Ukrainian War. Its co-founder and leader is Alexey Milchakov and it is part of the Wagner group. "Rusich" fought on the side of pro-Russian separatists in the Donbas war from June 2014 to July 2015, and in the Russian invasion of Ukraine alongside Russian troops.

History 
The foundations of the Rusich group were laid in 2009, when a military training base was founded by Alexey Milchakov, a neo-Nazi from Saint Petersburg. He had the nickname "Fritz" before being sent to the Donbas (there he changed to the call sign "Serb"). He took part in the Partizan paramilitary training program at the Novorossiya Aid Coordination Center (KCPN) run by the Russian Imperial Legion, a paramilitary arm of the Russian Imperial Movement. Both Milchakov and the nominal commander of the Wagner group Dmitry Utkin served in the 76th Guards Air Assault Division of the Airborne Forces.

According to Milchakov, "Rusich" consists of "nationalist Rodnovers, volunteers from Russia and Europe", operates as a "closed collective" and is a unit in which Russian nationalists receive combat training. The units turned out to be staffed by members of the GROM special unit, which is part of the Federal Drug Control Service. The brothers Konstantin and Boris Voevodin, for example, are Russian nationalists from St. Petersburg.

Donbas war 
The group has been fighting on the side of pro-Russian separatists in the Donbas war since June 2014, conducting reconnaissance and sabotage operations behind Ukrainian lines, and also played a significant role in several key battles at the beginning of the war.

2014 
In the summer of 2014, "Rusich" fought alongside the Russian separatist commander Lieutenant Colonel Alexander "Batman" Bednov and participated in the battles for the Luhansk Airport, near Novosvitlivka after the Armed Forces of Ukraine had cut the highway there, and placed Luhansk under blockade. They also took part in the battles near the city of Shchastia, Stanytsia Luhanska, in the assault on the village of Khryashchuvate, in the occupation of the villages of Heorhiivka, Velyka Verhunka, Lutuhyne.

At least one of the members of the Polish neo-Nazi group "Zadruga" fought as part of this unit.

One of the most well known operations of "Rusich" was the ambush of a column of the Ukrainian Aidar Battalion near the villages of Metalist and Tsvitni Pisky in the Luhansk Oblast on 5 September 2014, after a truce was supposed to have gone into effect. Andriy Khvedchak, coordinator of the Volyn Maidan Self-Defense, said that on 5 September 2014, a part of the company of the Aidar battalion was ambushed in the same place where Nadiya Savchenko was taken prisoner. Detachments of "Rusich" and RRT "Batman" set up an ambush on the highway and attacked the retreating "Aidar". Part of the second company of "Aydar" (Volyn) was ambushed by Russian special forces. According to him, the ambushed fighters were killed.  On 6 September, Semen Semenchenko reported that 11 soldiers were killed in an ambush "arranged by Russian special forces". On the same day, information appeared that from 20 to 29 fighters of the battalion were killed in an ambush.

In the fall of 2014, Rusich took part in the battles at the Donetsk International Airport along with the Sparta and Somali battalions.

2015 
The most famous losses are the death of Alexander Bednov's personal guards in an ambush on January 1, 2015. And a lesser-known story about this DShRG getting into the counter-base, during which the former Kyiv anti-fascist "Whiskas" died. In January 2015, Milchakov announced that his unit was no longer subordinate to the leadership of the Luhansk People's Republic. Thus, Milchakov reacted to the information about the killing of the former commander of the Batman group, Alexander Bednov. The commander called the Head of the Luhansk People's Republic Igor Plotnitsky and the government of the LPR “whore children” and said that his unit would fight “against them and against the Ukrainians”.

In February 2015 Milchakov was included in the EU sanctions list.

In 2015, together with the commanders of other groups, Milchakov and Petrovsky received a certificate of membership of the Union of Donbass Volunteers. Upon returning to Ukraine, the group was transferred to the Prizrak Brigade of Aleksey Mozgovoy. At the end of March 2015, after being redeployed to the Donetsk People's Republic due to persecution by the Ministry of State Security of the LPR, the group became part of the Viking battalion, where it took part in the battles around Volnovakha, near the villages of Belokamenki and Novolaspa. In mid-2015, the group was completely withdrawn from the Donbass.

From 2015 to 2022 
Upon his return from the Donbass, Milchakov engaged in combat training of teenagers in special camps in Russia. This was done in conjunction with right-wing radicals from the E.N.O.T. Corp. private military company. The online edition "Belarusian Partizan" calls the "raccoons" a group of Russian militants who took part in the war in Donbass from its very beginning, and that they are close friends with Milchakov. As the publication notes, since 2015, raccoon began its legalization in Russia. They received the status of a public organization and the full support of the state, regularly holding military-patriotic games-gatherings. The chief instructor of the organization, Roman Telenkevich, simultaneously headed the Union of Donbass Volunteers.

In 2016, Milchakov, as a member of the "Union of Volunteers of Donbass", may have been presented with an award by the head of the Republic of Crimea Sergey Aksyonov in the presence of the then assistant to the President of the Russian Federation Vladislav Surkov. Milchakov himself, however, was not shy in terms, criticizing the leadership of the LPR for this ostentatious “anti-fascism” on his VK page.

Milchakov's deputy, Jan Petrovsky, is a former resident of Norway, where he lived and worked with a Norwegian associated with the far-right group Soldiers of Odin. The peculiar glory of the Russian in the conflict in Donbass, apparently, was the last straw for the Norwegian authorities, and he was finally recognized as a threat to national security. In October 2016, Norwegian police arrested Petrovsky and deported him to Russia.

The group was one of the most mentioned in the negative connotation among the Ukrainian media and bloggers because of the photos of the killed soldiers of Ukraine and the stories that the group does not take prisoners. In 2017, the military prosecutor's office of Ukraine accused Milchakov of involvement in the murder of 40 Ukrainian soldiers.

In 2017, Rusich militants showed up in Syria guarding the strategically important oil and gas infrastructure owned by Russian companies. On their (now inaccessible) Instagram account, the militants posted photos from Palmyra in central Syria, where one of them poses in front of ancient ruins, raising his hand in a Nazi salute.

At the end of 2020, Alexey Milchakov said in an interview that the number of Rusich DShRG at that time was several dozen people, but “a lot of people come and they have to be weeded out”.

Russian invasion of Ukraine 
The group returned to Ukraine at the beginning of April 2022, as the Russian invasion was underway. Rusich's fighters were transferred to the Kharkiv Oblast of Ukraine, where they were photographed near the village of Pletenevka. In 2022, the detachment and its commanders Alexey Milchakov and Yan Petrovsky were included in the US sanctions list for their "special cruelty" in the battles in the Kharkiv Oblast.

Ideology and symbols 

"Rusich" is described as a far-right extremist and Neo-Nazi unit.

The following are used as symbols of the group: runes, in particular Tiwaz (ᛏ) (meaning the god of military prowess Týr), the eight-rayed Kolovrat, Valknut, and code slogans. Like many Russian nationalists, they also use the Russian imperial flag (black-yellow-white tricolor).

Milchakov became an influential figure among the neo-fascist youth in Russia. He is also one of the few who were not affected by arrests upon his return to Russia. According to Milchakov himself, his group does not even try to get into politics, no matter how insulting it is for decisions from above.

See also 
 Azov Regiment
 Wagner Group

References

External link

War in Donbas
Russian nationalist organizations
Neo-Nazism in Russia